Ammar Hamsan (born 5 November 1994) is a Yemeni footballer who plays as a defender.

International career

Hamsan made his international debut on October 13 2015 during a FIFA World Cup qualification match against North Korea. He was part of the Yemeni squad that played at the 2019 AFC Asian Cup in the United Arab Emirates.

References 

1994 births
Living people
Yemeni footballers
Yemeni expatriate footballers
Yemen international footballers
Yemeni expatriate sportspeople in Qatar
Expatriate footballers in Qatar
Al-Shula players
Al-Markhiya SC players
Qatar SC players
Yemeni League players
Qatar Stars League players
2019 AFC Asian Cup players

Association football defenders